WILI (1400 kHz) is an AM radio station in Willimantic, Connecticut, broadcasting at a power of 1,000 watts, full-time. WILI's programming is also heard on translator station W237EL (95.3 FM). It is affiliated with the ABC Entertainment Network, the Red Sox Radio Network, and the UConn Basketball and Football Networks. Its sister station is WILI-FM (98.3). The station is owned by Hall Communications, Inc.  The studios are located on Main Street in Willimatic, near the Willimantic Footbridge.

Ownership

In May 2005, Florida-based Hall Communications reached an agreement to acquire WILI and WILI-FM from  Nutmeg Broadcasting Co. At the time of the purchase, Hall already owned WICH and WCTY in Norwich and WNLC and WKNL in New London. In addition, Hall owns a number of stations in medium-sized markets along the eastern seaboard from Vermont to Florida.

Boom Box Parade
WILI has gained international attention for its unusual July 4 Boom Box Parade. Called "Connecticut's Unique People's Parade," it is the largest parade of its kind in the world. In 1986, no marching band could be found for Windham's Memorial Day Parade. Five weeks later, the "Boom Box Parade" concept was born, as WILI plays the marching band music on the air, while thousands march and watch, loudly playing their radios boom boxes.

Anyone can march in the Boom Box Parade. The only requirement is to wear some red, white, and blue, and bring a radio tuned to WILI. American flags are optional, but encouraged. There is no official theme for the parade. Every year WILI morning disc jockey Wayne Norman serves as the parade's Grand Marshal.

It was not held in 2020 due to the Coronavirus Pandemic but a Virtual Version was held instead.

Translators

References

External links

Willimantic, Connecticut
Windham County, Connecticut
ILI
Radio stations established in 1957
1957 establishments in Connecticut
Full service radio stations in the United States
Mainstream adult contemporary radio stations in the United States
News and talk radio stations in the United States